This is a list of census-designated places in Iowa. The United States Census Bureau defines census-designated places as unincorporated communities lacking elected municipal officers and boundaries with legal status.

As of the 2020 census, Iowa has 86 census-designated places, up from 62 in the 2010 census. Most CDPs in the state are small rural communities.

Census-designated places

See also 
 List of cities in Iowa
 List of counties in Iowa
 List of townships in Iowa

References 

 
Iowa